E class may refer to:

Automobiles

 Mercedes-Benz E-Class, a series of automobiles built by Mercedes-Benz
 Chrysler E-Class, a mid-sized car produced between 1983 and 1984
 E-segment, a European vehicle size class

Ships
 British E-class submarine, submarines of the Royal Navy that served in World War I
 United States E-class submarine, submarines of the United States Navy
 E-class cruiser, British Royal Navy cruisers in service during World War II
 E-class destroyer, British Royal Navy destroyers  in service during World War II
 E-class lifeboat, British lifeboats
 Mærsk E-class container ship, built between 2006 and 2008

Rail vehicles

New Zealand
 NZR E class (1872), Double Fairlie locomotive
 NZR E class (1906), Mallet locomotive
 New Zealand E class locomotive (1922), battery-electric locomotive

Ireland
 CIÉ E401 class, diesel shunting locomotive 
 CIÉ E421 class, diesel shunting locomotive

UK
 SECR E class, steam locomotives

Australia
 MRWA E class, diesel shunting locomotive 
 Victorian Railways E class, steam locomotives
 Victorian Railways E class (electric)
 WAGR E class, 4-6-2 steam locomotives
 WAGR E class (1879), 2-4-4-2T double-Fairlie locomotives 
 E-class Melbourne tram
 Sydney E-Class Tram

Other uses
 E-class blimp, United States Navy blimp

See also

 Class E (disambiguation)
 E type (disambiguation)
 Model E (disambiguation)
 E (disambiguation)